This is a list of members of both houses of the Federal Assembly from the Canton of Ticino.

Members of the Council of States

Members of the National Council

References

Lists of Members of the Swiss Federal Assembly by canton